Karara is a rural town and locality in the Southern Downs Region, Queensland, Australia.

Geography
The highway passes through the locality from the east to the south-west. The Toowoomba–Karara Road (State Route 48) connects the highway through to the north of the locality to Leyburn and ultimately through to Toowoomba. The South Western railway line passes through the locality roughly parallel and to the north of the highway with the locality served by two railway stations:

 Durikai railway station, now abandoned
 Karara railway station, serving the town.

Both the line and Karara railway station are no longer in active use.

The Durakai State Forest occupies the southern and eastern areas within the locality; otherwise it is freehold land predominantly used for farming apart from a small urban centre. There are a number of creeks running south to north through the locality which is in the drainage basin of the Condamine River.

History
The name Karara is believed to be an Aboriginal name for Canal Creek.

The South Western railway line from Warwick to Karara was opened in 1904.

Karara State School opened on 20 July 1908.

Karara Post Office opened on 1 July 1927 (a receiving office had been open from 1909) and closed in 1990.

Amenities 
The Southern Downs Regional Council operates a mobile library service which visits the Recreation Reserve.

The Karara branch of the Queensland Country Women's Association meets at the Karara Public Hall at 33 School Street.

Education 
Karara State School is a government primary (Prep-6) school for boys and girls at Karara School Road. In 2017, the school had an enrolment of 5 students with 3 teachers (2 full-time equivalent) and 5 non-teaching staff (1 full-time equivalent). In 2018, the school had an enrolment of 8 students with 2 teachers (1 full-time equivalent) and 5 non-teaching staff (2 full-time equivalent).

There are no secondary schools in Karara. The nearest government secondary schools are Warwick State High School (to Year 12) in Warwick to the east, Inglewood State School (to Year 10) in Inglewood to the south-west, Millmerran State School (to Year 10) in Millmerran to the north-west, Clifton State High School (to Year 12) in Clifton to the north-east, and Allora State School (to Year 10) in Allora to the north-east.

References

External links

 Town map of Karara, 1964

Towns in Queensland
Southern Downs Region
Towns in the Darling Downs
Localities in Queensland